Arcina is a monotypic moth genus in the family Geometridae. Its only species, Arcina fulgorigera, is found in Australia. Both the genus and species were first described by Francis Walker in 1863.

References

Oenochrominae
Geometridae genera
Monotypic moth genera